Tiškovac Lički is a village in Croatia.

Population

According to the 2011 census, Tiškovac Lički had 15 inhabitants.

Note: From 1857-1880 and from 1910-1948 name of the settlement was Tiškovac. In census years 1890 and 1900 it include data for the former settlement of Gornji Tiškovac. It also include data for the former settlement of Vagan Osredački.

1991 census

According to the 1991 census, settlement of Tiškovac Lički had 114 inhabitants, which were ethnically declared as this:

Austro-hungarian 1910 census

According to the 1910 census, settlement of Tiškovac Lički had 399 inhabitants in 3 hamlets, which were linguistically and religiously declared as this:

External links 

</ref>

Literature 

  Savezni zavod za statistiku i evidenciju FNRJ i SFRJ, popis stanovništva 1948, 1953, 1961, 1971, 1981. i 1991. godine.
 Book: "Narodnosni i vjerski sastav stanovništva Hrvatske, 1880-1991: po naseljima, author: Jakov Gelo, izdavač: Državni zavod za statistiku Republike Hrvatske, 1998., ;

References

Populated places in Zadar County
Lika
Serb communities in Croatia